Sonchus congestus is a species of flowering plant in the family Asteraceae. It is endemic to the Canary Islands (Gran Canaria and Tenerife).

Description
The leaves form a rosette at the ends of the stems. The leaves are relatively smooth (subglabrous), and have triangular to rounded lobes along their length.

Distribution
Sonchus congestus is endemic to the Canary Islands. It is also found in the central and northern regions of Gran Canaria.

References

congestus
Flora of the Canary Islands